Charles Willard may refer to:

Charles Willard (golfer), American golfer
Charles Andrew Willard (1857–1914), United States federal judge
Charles Arthur Willard (born 1945), American academic
Charles W. Willard (1827–1880), U.S. Representative from Vermont
Charles F. Willard (1883–1977), American aviator and engineer